Corydalis ambigua is a tuberous early flowering east Asian flowering plant species in the poppy family Papaveraceae. Its exact native range is obscure due to taxonomic confusion. It is one of the sources of the drug tetrahydropalmatine.

Chemistry 

Corydalis ambigua contains a variety of alkaloids including corynoline, acetylcorynoline, d-corydalin,  dl-tetrahydropalmatine,  protopine,  tetrahydrocoptisine,  dl-tetrahydrocoptisine, d-corybulbine and allocryptopine.

Chemical derivatives of tetrahydroprotoberberines present in Corydalis ambigua have been studied as potential ways to increase pain tolerance and for treating drug addiction. Further, they may represent a category of neurotransmitter stabilizers which have potential use in broad range of psychotic and neurological disorders.

Use 
Cordyalis ambigua is part of the traditional Ainu cuisine:

See also 
Chinese herbology

References

Further reading 

ambigua
Medicinal plants of Asia